Following the last two elections in the municipality, a change of the party holding mayor's position had occurred.

In the last election, a dramatic deal that would see the Social Democrats and Liberal Alliance split the term in two periods, had been agreed upon. However Liberal Alliance decided to not take on the mayor's position, in the last two years as agreed.

In this election, Venstre would become the largest party for the first time in the municipality's history. They would win 11 seats, an increase of 1 compared to 2017. Danish Social Liberal Party, the Conservatives and Venstre would eventually come to an agreement that would see Knud Vincents from Venstre become the new mayor of the municipality.

Electoral system
For elections to Danish municipalities, a number varying from 9 to 31 are chosen to be elected to the municipal council. The seats are then allocated using the D'Hondt method and a closed list proportional representation.
Slagelse Municipality had 31 seats in 2021

Unlike in Danish General Elections, in elections to municipal councils, electoral alliances are allowed.

Electoral alliances  

Electoral Alliance 1

Electoral Alliance 2

Results

Notes

References 

Slagelse